2021 Tobago House of Assembly election may refer to:

January 2021 Tobago House of Assembly election
December 2021 Tobago House of Assembly election